The various toponyms in the historical region of Lorraine are often known by very different names depending on the language in which they are expressed. This article provides an understanding of the linguistic and historical origin of this diversity and lists a number of correspondences for communes and lesser localities in the four departments of the former region: Meuse, Meurthe-et-Moselle, Moselle, and Vosges.

Exonyms and endonyms 

In the context of toponyms, and with regard to the scope of this article, exonyms and endonyms are the differing external and internal names, respectively, used by different languages or cultures for a specific geographic place. For the people that speak German and live in Germany, for example, Deutschland is their endonym for that country. Conversely, Allemagne is the exonym in French, 'Germany' is the exonym in English, and so on.

The same idea can apply within a country too, between regions having vastly different linguistical and cultural histories. The emphasis in this article is on those toponyms that began as Gallo-Roman endonyms in some cases, but more often as endonyms following the Germanic migrations, and particularly what emerged from the Merovingian and Carolingian dynasties. Now, more than a millennium later, many of these toponyms have three different names—in Lorraine Franconian, French, and German—due to shifts in culture and language and changes in land possession.

Linquistical aspects of toponyms in Lorraine

The 'determinant-determined' of the Romano-Francs 

The origin of toponyms, of which exonyms are a certain type, is sometimes controversial, especially in Lorraine where successive or simultaneous occupations by different peoples and changes in culture have often influenced toponymy more than elsewhere.

As in all regions marked by Germanic influence, adjectives or appellatives often precede nouns. Many toponyms are formed with the name of a local lord or land owner. In some cases, however, a particular topographical, religious, or historical aspect may have played a more important role, which is difficult to determine in Gallo-Romance formations in particular. While Gallic toponyms are often poorly clarified due to insufficient knowledge of the language, Romanesque toponyms often play the role of those older Celtic toponyms that have been redesigned in the Romanesque style.

The Ripuarian and Salian Franks, and for some time also the Alemanni in eastern Lorraine, introduced Germanic toponyms. A patronymic practice of the Romano-Francs that developed from the Merovingian Dynasty was to merge Roman and Germanic habits. The Germanic rule of word composition from right to left (i.e. the decisive-determined order), largely governs the formation of Lorraine toponyms, both in Germanic and in Roman dialect.

For example, the Lorraine dialect places the adjective epithet before the noun it describes. A "white rupt" is a "white stream" (clear and transparent meaning). This is especially true for oronyms and toponyms in localities that make extensive use of local dialect. Gerardmer (Giraumouè) is the "Lake of Gerold", which can therefore be translated in the same order in German language: Geroldsee. The use of Geroltzsee is attested locally as early as 1484.

This information is fundamental in Romanesque toponymy and the determining-defined order, sometimes misunderstood, is the rule in Normandy (except Avranchin), Picardy, Nord-Pas-de-Calais, Champagne-Ardenne, northern Franche-Comté and Île-de-France, so it is not surprising that this method of composition is present in Romanesque Lorraine.

In the west and south, the reverse order — determined-determinant — is more dominant. Thus, for example, names like Neufchâteau, Neufchâtel, Neuville, and Neubourg du nord have opposite construction to Chateauneuf, Castelnau, Villeneuve, and Bourgneuf further south. Even if a Lorrain does not feel completely at home in Flanders because of the Flemish forms (-kerque, -em, -hem, -hout, -brouck, -berghe, -dorp) largely different from German forms, and even more so in Normandy with the Anglo-Norroese appellatives (-crique-, -ham, -londe, brique- [?], hougue / hogue,  / {{Not a typo|-tour(ps))}}, they can easily feel a common practice (-kirch, -om, -heim, -holtz, -bruck, -berg, -troff / -droff).

In German-speaking Lorraine, the word dorf (for 'village') is often passed to troff by hardening from /d/ to /t/ and metathesis from /r/.

The toponyms in -angel (Common Germanic -ing) are typically Lorrainian and correspond to a relatively recent decline in Germanic speaking in Lorraine. Elsewhere this form is exceptional except in Luxembourg and the Luxembourgish part of Wallonia. In Flanders and Artois, -inge, -in, -ain, its correspondents, are also the expression of a decline in the Flemish language or at least a desire to make toponyms more Gallicized. In the Romanesque area, where Germanic speakers disappeared very early, the suffix is found in the forms -ans in Franche-Comté or Burgundy, in the southwest and a little in Languedoc in the forms -eins, -ens, -ein and sometimes also -ans. This suffix is much rarer in the west, where it sometimes takes the form of -an or -angles. Its absence is remarkable in northern Picardy, a region where Romanesque toponymy is the most "Germanized" in France.

Paradoxically, in Romanesque Lorraine, there is no common series of calls in the north and northwest, whose Germanic origin is proven. Thus, these types are not frequently found:

 Husdinium of *husidinja (shelter) in Hodeng, Hodent, Houdan, Hesdin...
 hlar (wasteland) in Mouflers, Flers, Meulers...
  (temple) in Neauphe, Neaufles, Neauphle or Niafles, and Boffles, Bouafles...
 afisna / avisna (pasture) in Avesnes, Avernes...
 *Rosbaki (reed stream) has evolved in Frankish Lorraine in Rohrbach, Rorbach, elsewhere in the north and northwest, and there are Robecq, Rebecques, Rebais, or Rebets...

You can find toponyms in short from the Doubs to Normandy, from Ile-de-France to Walloon Belgium. The -court toponyms have been chronologically replaced by the -ville toponyms, of which Romanesque Lorraine is the second 'provider' after Normandy and before the exceptional area of Beauce. There are also some in the Charentes and in the southwest around Toulouse.

Lorraine diglossia 

Independent ducal Lorraine included a Bailiwick of Germany that crossed the current Moselle border to the north. The Lorraine Romans referred to all those who spoke a Germanic dialect as 'Germans' as opposed to their Romance language. So a German (or Ollemand) for a Romanesque Lorrain can also be a Lorrain of the Bailiwick of Germany or an Alsatian, or any person living beyond that. Conversely, neighbouring German-speaking people often called the Welsches romanophones. This is also the case in Switzerland.

Lorraine's toponymy is not only a back-and-forth between the German and French forms more specific to the last two centuries. It is older, and shows a sensitivity common to all of eastern France where the 'determinant-determined' pair largely dominates while respecting habits and rules that ignore the heritage language.

In the Lorraine of the Ancient Regime Society, the coexistence of a Romanesque and Germanic form for the same place was not uncommon. It was only with the integration into France under Stanislaus and then under the Jacobin regime and Prussian imperialism that both language and toponyms took on a political, patriotic, symbolic and identity value. Previously, the Duke of Lorraine recognized the official existence of German and French on his lands at the risk of having to have the most important acts and charters translated one way or the other. In the regions of passage between the Germanic area and the Romanesque basin, the same place was named in the language of the respective speaker. This is the case for the toponym, Hautes Chaumes, in the Vosges, which is in a Vosges dialect and differs from the initial Alsatian dialect.

More than standard French, the Lorraine dialect allows a cross-reading of the region's toponyms and makes it possible to establish a correspondence between the two families of languages present on Lorraine's territory. This is one of Lorraine's unique characteristics, its function as a language buffer region, or space between.

Historical aspects of toponyms in Lorraine

Definition of terms 

The subject of terms is very sensitive. It is linked to recent history, therefore the definition of terms is important.

Since that which is Germanic cannot be 'Germanized', the term "Germanization" for the periods 1870-1918 and 1940-1945 should be understood as an adaptation of form or graphics to standard German as intended by the heads of state of the last German empires. The Anglo-Saxons speak here rather of 'prussification' to avoid confusion. Moreover, many Moselle toponyms, characteristic of the Franconian Lorraine dialect, also exist in Germany or Austria. For a Francophone, Merlebach is objectively no less Germanic than Merlenbach.

The phenomenon is not specific to Moselle, a large part of Germany, especially in the south, had to willingly adopt standard German names for their official signs, but on the ground, the inhabitants continued to designate their village in the local form. No one is expecting to see 'Stuegert' on a city sign instead of Stuttgart today. Even today, an Alsatian and a Mosellan have their local form to designate their agglomeration. This also applies to village names in Lorraine dialect and beyond for all regions of France in local languages and dialects.

The difference is that Moselle suffered the arrival of 'prussification' as a denial of its specificity in view of the brutality of certain measures that followed the de facto annexation after the abandonment of the territories by the parliament meeting in Bordeaux in May 1871. This annexation was difficult to experience throughout the annexed Moselle because of the desire to 'prussify' Moselle by erasing its specificities. This was experienced as a constraint even in the Lorraine-Franco-speaking (Germanic) areas. It must also be said that part of the annexed Moselle known as Bezirk Lothringen, has always been Romanesque, mainly Metzgau and Saulnois, except formerly the Dieuze region. Here, the Germanization of the toponym is an indisputable fact (Fresnes - Eschen). The locals were forced to change their names. This is why it must always be borne in mind that the phenomenon of "Germanization" does not cover the same thing depending on whether you start from an original Romanesque or historically Germanic toponym.

French and Lorraine Franconian (and Alsatian in Alsace) serve to make an ideological and political break with everything that sounds 'Prussian' or 'standardized German', because the occupants forbade or fought them. Thus, a simple 'n' at the end of a local toponym is enough to "Germanize" it when it is Germanic: Thedinge becomes Thedingen. At the same time, French Francizes the name by removing the dialectal 'e' to give Théding. The accent adds a little more gallicity. As well, it frequently reverses the names from -er to -re. Diacritical signs such as accents and umlauts have indeed played a role in francization or Germanization (e.g. Buding / Büdingen). Similarly, the accentuation of names is central. Lorraine Franconian and German emphasize the same linguistic relationship, placing a tonic accent at the initial of words, in general. On the other hand, the French name is unemphasized and is characterized by an increase in tone on the final part of the word. The difference between the Germanic and French form is audible.

Waves of francization and germanization 

In the south of the Pays de Nied, there are current toponyms using -court that were formerly -troff / -torff. For example, Arraincourt from Armestroff, Thicourt from Diederstroff, Thonville from Oderstroff, Hernicourt (in Herny) from Hermerstorf.

At the time of the Ancien Régime, referring to the sociopolitical system that prevailed in France for the two centuries preceding and up to the French Revolution, several Lorraine towns were recognized by two names, one in French and one in German. The following name-pair examples are found the dictionaries of Henri Lepage and Ernest de Bouteiller, respectively, and noted as recognized in 1594:

 Mulcey was (fr) Mellecey alias (de) Metzingen
 Zommange was (fr) Semanges alias (de) Simingen
 Chemery-les-Deux was (fr) Clsmey alias (de) Schomberg
 Les Étangs was (de) Tenchen alias (fr) Lestanche
 Macker was (de) Machern alias (fr) Maizières
 Many was (de) Niderheim alias (fr) Magny
 Morhange was (fr) Morhanges alias (de) Morchingen
 Ottonville was (de) Ottendorf alias (fr) Ottonville
 Roupeldange was (de) Rupplingen alias (fr) Ruppeldanges
 Suisse was (fr) Xousse alias (de) Soultzen
 Varize was (fr) Warize alias (de) Weybelsskirchen
 Pontigny, was (de) Nidbrücken alias (fr) Pont de Niet

These were certainly not the only spellings before or after 1594. The history for Pontigny, for example, a locality (or hamlet) in the commune Condé-Northen since 1810, is attested as:

 (de) Bruque 1339
 (de) Brücke 1485
 (de) Nydbrück alias (fr) Pont de Nied by the 16th century
 (de) Nidbrück and (fr) Pontnied in 1542
 (de) Nidbrücken alias (fr) Pont de Niet in 1594
 (de) Niedbruch in 1606
 (de) Niedbroug by the 17th century
 (fr) Pontigni 1756
 (fr) Poutigny 1793
 (de) Niedbrücken 1940-44
 (fr) Pontigny ever since

There were further name or spelling differences in the centuries prior, after localities were formed under the Frankish dynasties up to when first attestations are known.

The names of many communes in Moselle were Francized at the end of the Revolution, in particular those having the suffix -engen or -ingen, which was sometimes simplified into -ing or definitively replaced by the Romanesque form in -ing (e.g. -ingen was Romanized into -ingas and -inges since the Middle Ages, hence -ang). While in Bas-Rhin -ingen was preserved. To a lesser extent, this suffix has also been Francized over the centuries in other forms, including -ang, -in, -court, -gny, and so forth.

The toponyms in German-speaking Moselle were often spelled -willer (sometimes -weiller) in the Bulletins des lois and several dictionaries from the 19th century until 1870. This form subsequently disappeared in the 20th century, after the World Wars. While in Alsace, the -willers were preserved, although they were sometimes mentioned -viller and -viler in 1793–1801.

Some municipalities had a standard German name between 1793 and 1802, such as Folschviller (Folschweiler 1793), Ébersviller (Ebersweiler 1793), Berviller-en-Moselle (Berweiler 1793), Schmittviller (Schmittweiler 1793), Bisten-en-Lorraine (Bisten im Loch 1793), Château-Rouge (Rothdorf 1793), Mouterhouse (Mutterhausen 1801), Soucht (Sucht 1801), Rodalbe (Rodalben 1801), Merlebach (Merlenbach 1801), Dalem (Dalheim 1801), Altrippe (Altrippen 1793).

The dictionaries of Henri Lepage on the Meurthe and Ernest de Bouteiller on the Moselle, written before 1871, prove that many municipalities still had an alias in German during the 19th century. For example, Hagondange, Haute-Vigneulles, and Lorquin cited 'in German' as Hagelingen, Oberfillen and Lœrchingen in these same dictionaries, most recently written in 1868. The Germanization of names by the Prussians from 1871 onwards is therefore not an invention (except in certain cases), which used old Germanic references, sometimes the latest one. For example Argancy Germanized in Argesingen during the World War II, refers to an old Germanic mention Argesinga dating from 848. and Chicourt Germanized as Diexingen (1915-1918) from the Diekesinga mention from 1121 and 1180 (-inga being the primitive form of -ingen).

All the toponyms in the department had been gradually Germanized in the German period of the Alsace-Lorraine. The place names of German-speaking Lorraine were first Germanized, adjectives (top, bottom...) were then translated, then the names of villages close to the linguistic boundary of Moselle and the last ones, including all those of French-speaking Moselle, were Germanized on 2 September 1915 (e.g. Augny).

At the end of the First World War in 1918, these place names reverted to their pre-1870 version.

All toponyms are Germanised after the annexation of 1940, most of the time using their 1918 form or another more or less different one. They were re-Francized in 1945.

Roman / Germanic correspondences

Comparison of Lorrain appellatives

Toponymic correspondences with communes in Meuse

Toponymic correspondences with communes in Moselle

Toponyms from the reorganization of territory 

The reorganization of territory is a common occurrence throughout history, thus an important consideration in toponymy. Counties and cantons can be broken apart. New communes can be formed by joining several localities together. And sometimes through these changes a given name can migrate to a different locality that where it was originally used. Records of such territorial changes are increasingly scarce with the centuries, thus territorial histories tend to obscure with time. Few attestations are available for the founding or change of territory through the late first millennium, but records gradually improve, and by the late second millennium, scholars like Cassini, Lepage, and Boutilleir have largely collated all the toponyms attested in charts concerning the history of Austrasia into dictionaries and other tombs of reference.

Consider Condé-Northen in Moselle, which began as the ancient commune, Condé (specifically Condium or Condicum), attested as existing in 787. In 1804, a neighboring commune, Northen, was attached to Condé and the new territory became known by the name it bears today. But the growth did not stop there. In 1810, Pontigny was attached, and finally Loutremange was attached in 1979 by order of a prefectoral decree (arrêté préfectoral). While Northen, Pontigny, and Loutremange are no longer communes, thus no longer considered territorial collectivities, they are still recognized as localities within Condé-Northen.

Today communes increasingly join around large cities, where suburban communes grow into each other. For this to be possible, the communes must be adjacent and within the same department. Officials from both communes must jointly request the merger. The new municipality is typically named by hyphenating the two former toponyms together (seemingly in alphabetical order). Examples include Ancy-Dornot (formerly the communes of Ancy and Dornot) and Freyming-Merlebach (formerly Freyming and Merlebach), both in Moselle. Others certainly exist, and more likely will in the future. Municipalities of this kind are formed in the historical region of Alsace as well.

Yet another situation, though more rural and rare, is a large commune originally formed around multiple hamlets, farms, or other lesser localities that are nevertheless on the map. An example here concerns Métairies-Saint-Quirin, a relatively new commune formed around 1790 when the jurisdiction of the priory of Saint-Quirin was partially changed, possibly in relation to the National Convention. The distributed commune's domain originally encompassed eleven large farms, called censes: Craon (then Créon), Cubolot, Fontaine aux Chênes, Halmoze, Heille (or Helde), L'hor, Le Jardinot (became Haute-Gueisse during the Revolution), Jean Limon, La Petite Maladrerie, Rond-Pré, and Viller (or Courtegain). Of the original eleven properties making up the commune, only six still remain: Cubolot, Halmoze, Heille, Haute-Gueisse, Jean Limon, and Rond-Pré, as found on the map of Métairies-Saint-Quirin. The town hall of Métairies-Saint-Quirin has been located in Cubolot since 1920.

See also 
 German exonyms
 List of European exonyms

References 

Exonym
Moselle
Meuse (department)
Meurthe-et-Moselle
Moselle (department)
Vosges (department)
Lorraine
Names of places in France